Orbital Express Launch Ltd., or Orbex, is a United Kingdom-based aerospace company that is developing a small commercial orbital rocket called Prime. Orbex is headquartered in Forres, Moray, in Scotland and has subsidiaries in Denmark and Germany. Its future launch complex is proposed to be built on the A' Mhòine peninsula in the county of Sutherland, northern Scotland.

Overview
The company was founded in 2015 as Moonspike Ltd., with the goal of crowdfunding a private spacecraft mission to the moon. A Kickstarter campaign running from 1 October to 1 November 2015 raised less than £79,000 ($122,000) out of a goal of £600,000 ($925,000), rendering Moonspike ineligible for the funds. Moonspike was renamed Orbital Express Launch Ltd. in 2016, with the company now aiming to provide commercial launch services of nano- and microsatellites, especially CubeSats, to polar and sun-synchronous low Earth orbits. In July 2018, Orbex secured £30 million ($39.6 million) in public and private funding for the development of its orbital rocket system, named Prime. In October 2022 Orbex closed a £40.4 million Series C funding round. Orbex has opened a factory for Prime in Scotland that will eventually employ 150 people. Currently, the company is working on developing the Prime vehicle, while preparing for the initial launch from the Sutherland spaceport.

The Sutherland spaceport in northern Scotland was initially intended to be shared with Lockheed Martin, who at the time did not have a launch vehicle, but their strategic shareholding in Rocket Lab led to speculation that they would launch with the Rocket Lab Electron rocket, but since the two vehicles (Electron and Prime) use different propellants, the two companies would have separate launch pads while sharing some common infrastructure. The planning application for the site, however, includes only one launchpad. Lockheed Martin then moved their launch plans to a competing site in the Shetland Isles. Orbex also plans to launch from a future spaceport in the Portuguese Azores.

Prime 

Orbex is currently developing a light launch vehicle called Prime, and its booster (1st stage) is planned to be reusable. One cited advantage of using propane is that it remains liquid at cryogenic temperatures, which enables a design where a central carbon-fibre tank of propane is surrounded by an outer tank of liquid oxygen, creating a light structural mass.

The maiden flight of Prime is expected to occur in 2023, subject to the availability of Space Hub Sutherland and a Civil Aviation Authority launch license, for Surrey Satellite Technology Ltd. Orbex also announced it was chosen by nanosatellite startup Astrocast to launch their communications satellites.

See also 
Skyrora, another British launch service provider
Rocket Lab, a US and New Zealand based smallsat launch provider
Black Arrow, a retired British rocket
PLD Space, another European smallsat launcher based in Spain
Private spaceflight

References

Microsatellite launch vehicles
Private spaceflight companies
Space launch vehicles of the United Kingdom